Eliseo Morales Walter (23 April 1898 – 5 January 1993) was a Spanish rower. He competed in the men's eight event at the 1924 Summer Olympics.

References

External links
 

1898 births
1993 deaths
Spanish male rowers
Olympic rowers of Spain
Rowers at the 1924 Summer Olympics
People from Yecla
Sportspeople from the Region of Murcia